Rabboni was a steam tug that operated on the west coast of the United States starting in 1865.

Career
Rabboni was built in San Francisco, California, and launched on April 9, 1865.  The tug was brought north to the mouth of the Columbia river, arriving in July 1865, and reaching Portland, Oregon on July 29, 1865.  The vessel was commanded by Capt. Paul Corno, who was also its main owner.  En route Rabboni had stopped at Coos Bay and procured a three-month supply of coal, and picked up 18,000 board feet of lumber.

On August 10, 1865, Rabboni towed in the bark Almatia, which became the first vessel towed across the Columbia bar by a regular tug.  Rabboni was considered a good tug for the time, but ran into opposition at the Columbia from the bar pilots and prejudice among sailing ship owners against steam craft of any kind.  In March, 1866 Rabboni proving unable to win sufficient business, was returned to San Francisco.

After many years out of the area, Rabboni was returned to the Pacific Northwest, this time to the Strait of Juan de Fuca, in an effort to pick up tow work from inbound ships headed for ports in Puget Sound.  This placed Rabboni in opposition to the powerful Puget Sound Tug Company, and again Rabboni proved unable to compete.  There was thereafter no steam tug on the Columbia river bar until 1869.

In 1890, Rabboni came under the ownership of F.B. Cornwall.  By 1898 Rabboni had been laid up for some time at the Stetson and Post lumber mill in Seattle.  The Klondike gold rush created a great demand for shipping, which resulted, as one historian as written, in “large number of old vessels pulled off the mudflats and out of backwater sloughs from Oakland Creek to British Columbia."  Rabboni was one of these vessels, and was refitted for tow work in Alaska, but proved to be unsuccessful.

Reconstruction
In 1900, Rabboni, still owned by F.B. Cornwall, was rebuilt, and a new compound steeple-type steam engine was installed.  Rabboni was last used in service for the Bellingham Bay Improvement Company, whose lumber mills were controlled by Cornwall.

Notes

References 
 Newell, Gordon R., ed., H.W. McCurdy Marine History of the Pacific Northwest,  Superior Publishing Co., Seattle, WA (1966)
 
 Harte, Bret, “Evolution of Ship-Building and Shipping in California”, Overland Monthly, and Out West Magazine, Volume 25, at page 285 (1895)

1865 ships
Steamboats of Washington (state)
Propeller-driven steamboats of Washington (state)
Steamboats of Oregon
Steamboats of California
Steamboats of the Columbia River
Ships built in San Francisco
Steam tugs
Steam tugs of Washington (state)